Safeway, Inc. is an American supermarket chain founded by Marion Barton Skaggs in April 1915 in American Falls, Idaho. The chain provides grocery items, food and general merchandise and features a variety of specialty departments, such as bakery, delicatessen, floral and pharmacy, as well as Starbucks coffee shops and fuel centers. It is a subsidiary of Albertsons after being acquired by private equity investors led by Cerberus Capital Management in January 2015. Safeway's primary base of operations is in the Western United States with some stores located in the Mid-Atlantic region of the Eastern Seaboard. The subsidiary is headquartered in Pleasanton, California, with its parent company, Albertsons, headquartered in Boise, Idaho.

Safeway stores operate under the logo of a stylized white "S" inside a rounded red square with the slogan "Ingredients for life". Following the organics trend, the stores have expanded the number of organic fruits and vegetables in the produce section and offer other items under the "O Organics" label. Stores may have a Starbucks, a deli counter, a meat department, a produce section, a flower department, a bakery, a pharmacy, a liquor section, and/or many aisles of nonperishable items. The stores offer many in-house private label brands as well as name brands across all product categories.

History
In 1915, S.M. Skaggs, a Baptist minister, was convinced that the prevailing system of allowing customers to buy food from stores on credit increased prices, because grocers and storekeepers had to wait to get paid, and it made the customers overly dependent on those grocers and storekeepers. He described selling items on credit as "the growing evil of installment purchasing". S.M. Skaggs established a store in American Falls, Idaho called Skaggs, and he sold groceries for cash at the time of sale. Skaggs was also against the prevailing high-cost system of the grocer having clerks serving all the needs of each customer. He was an early proponent of the self-service concept. Items were kept within the customers' reach, on shelves that hugged the walls, with aisles clear for customers to walk comfortably. Customers picked up baskets as they entered the store, selected what they wanted from the shelves, and paid for their purchases at a checkout counter.

When S.M. Skaggs decided he wanted to focus on his Baptist ministry, his son M.B. Skaggs purchased the grocery store from him for $1,088. His second store opened in Burley, Idaho, in 1918. By 1921, M.B. Skaggs owned multiple stores in Idaho and Montana.

M.B. Skaggs moved to Portland, Oregon in 1921, and he established four groceries in town that year, in part by buying a grocer and a coffee company. The chain, which operated as two separate businesses, Skaggs Cash Stores and Skaggs United Stores, grew quickly, and Skaggs enlisted the help of his five brothers to grow the network of stores. M.B.'s business strategy, to give his customers value and to expand by keeping a narrow profit margin, proved spectacularly successful. By 1926, he had opened 428 Skaggs stores in 10 states. M.B. almost doubled the size of his business that year when he merged his company with 322  Sam Seelig Company stores and incorporated as Safeway, Inc., because he thought that a chain that would outlive him should not carry his name.

The point of the name was that the grocery operated on a cash-and-carry basis – it did not offer credit, as grocers traditionally had done. It was the "safe way" to buy food because a family could not get into debt via its grocery bill (as many families did at the time, a contributing cause of the Great Depression).

In 1926, Charles E. Merrill, the founder of the Merrill Lynch brokerage firm, saw an opportunity to consolidate the West Coast grocery industry. Towards this end, he purchased the 322-store Safeway chain of W.R.H. Weldon, who wished to exit retailing and concentrate on wholesale. Then, in June 1926, Merrill offered Skaggs either $7 million outright or $1.5 million plus 30,000 shares in the merged firm. Skaggs took the latter. On July 1, 1926, Safeway merged with the 673 stores from Skaggs United Stores of Idaho and Skaggs Cash Stores of California. On completion of the Skaggs/Safeway merger, M. B. Skaggs became the Chief Executive of the business. Two years later, Skaggs listed Safeway on the New York Stock Exchange. In the 1930s, Safeway introduced produce pricing by the pound, adding "sell by" dates on perishables, nutritional labeling, and some of the first parking lots.

The merger instantly created the largest chain of grocery stores west of the Mississippi. In the 1930s, Charles E. Merrill temporarily left Merrill Lynch to help manage Safeway. At the time of the merger, the company was headquartered in Reno, Nevada. In 1929, it was relocated to a former grocery warehouse in Oakland, California. Safeway headquarters remained there until the move to Pleasanton, California in 1996.

In the late 1930s, the New Negro Alliance boycotted the Sanitary Grocery Company (then a Safeway subsidiary) to pressure store owners to employ black people, especially in predominantly black neighborhoods. The Sanitary Grocery Company successfully sought an injunction against the New Negro Alliance, which was upheld by the Washington, D.C. Court of Appeals. This led to the 1938 landmark U.S. Supreme Court decision of New Negro Alliance v. Sanitary Grocery Co., which defended the right to peaceful protest in the resolution of labor disputes.

In 1969, the Black Panther Party and the United Farm Workers launched simultaneous boycotts of Safeway grocery stores, which were the largest grocery store chain in the U.S. West at that time. The Panthers boycotted due to Safeway's refusal to donate to their Free Breakfast for Children Program, created to serve daily hot breakfasts to underprivileged children throughout the U.S. The United Farm Workers boycotted Safeway because the chain continued to sell California grapes despite the union's nationwide boycott. The Panthers and United Farm Workers also acted in solidarity with each other's goals in boycotting Safeway, including during a 1973 Panthers demonstration outside an Oakland Safeway store documented by KPIX Eyewitness news, in which protestors carried signs that read "Boycott Safeway, Boycott Grapes."

Expansion
The initial public offering price of Safeway stock was $226 in 1927. A five for one split in 1928 brought the price down to under $50. Over the next few years, Charles Merrill, with financing supplied by Merrill Lynch, then began aggressively acquiring numerous regional grocery store chains for Safeway in a rollup strategy. Early acquisitions included significant parts of Piggly Wiggly chain as part of the breakup of that company by Merrill Lynch and Wall Street.

Most transactions involved the swap of stock certificates, with little cash changing hands. Most acquired chains retained their own names until the mid-1930s.

In 1929, there were rumors of a Safeway-Kroger merger.

The number of stores peaked at 3,400 in 1932, when expansion ground to a halt. The Great Depression had finally impacted the chain, which began to focus on cost control. In addition, numerous smaller grocery stores were being replaced with larger supermarket stores. By 1933, the chain ranked second in the grocery industry behind The Great Atlantic & Pacific Tea Company and ahead of Kroger.

In 1935, Safeway sold its nine stores in Honolulu, Hawaii "because of the inconvenience of proper supervision". Also in 1935, independent groceries in California convinced the California legislature to enact a progressive tax on chain stores. Before the act took effect, Safeway filed a petition to have the law put to a referendum. In 1936, the California electorate voted to repeal the law.

In 1936, Safeway introduced a money back guarantee on meat.

In November 2016, Safeway Inc. agreed to buy Andronico's remaining stores, which were based primarily in the San Francisco Bay Area. When Andronico's closed as an independent company, it had a total of nine locations: three in Berkeley (Solano Avenue, Telegraph Avenue, and Shattuck Avenue); one in the Rancho Shopping Center in Los Altos; one on Irving Street San Francisco; one at the Stanford Shopping Center in Palo Alto; one in Walnut Creek; one in Danville; and one in town of San Anselmo in Marin County. The stores began closing in January 2017, with the North Berkeley, California store closing first. In February 2019, Safeway said that it was considering bringing back the Andronico's name. By February 2020, six Safeway stores were operating under the Andronico's Community Market label, with a seventh planned. Four Andronico’s stores in the Bay Area were renamed Safeway Community Market after the 2016 acquisition, though the flagship store in the Sunset District kept the Andronico’s name. Another store in Monterey opened in January 2019 as Andronico’s. In February 2020, four locations of Safeway Community Markets returned to the Andronico’s name - two in Berkeley, one in Los Altos, and one in San Anselmo.

International expansion

The company expanded into Canada in 1929 with 127 stores (which became Canada Safeway Limited and which was sold to Sobeys in 2013); into the United Kingdom in 1962 (which became Safeway plc); into Australia in 1963 (which became Safeway Australia); and into West Germany in 1964. The company also has operations in Saudi Arabia and Kuwait in a licensing and management agreement with the Tamimi Group during the 1980s. In 1981, it acquired 49% of Mexican retailer Casa Ley.

Safeway usually achieved international expansion by acquiring one or more small chains in a given country. It expanded into Saudi Arabia and Kuwait, however, through a joint venture. This initial nucleus of stores received Safeway systems and technology and then expanded organically. International chains acquired include:

1940s–1970s

In 1941, Marion B. Skaggs retired from the Safeway board of directors.

In 1947, the company's sales exceeded $1 billion for the first time. By 1951, total sales had reached nearly $1.5 billion. The company adopted the S logo, which it still uses, in 1962.

In 1955, Robert A. Magowan became Chairman of the Board of Safeway. Magowan had married Charles Merrill's daughter, Doris. Magowan also assumed the title of President in 1956. He remained President until 1968, and a member of the board until 1978. In 1966, Robert A Magowan brought his star Meat Processing Plant Manager, Michael F. Concannon to Oakland to become the Head of Meat Processing in North America. He retired in 1978 as well. Mike was instrumental in opening the Stockton plant. The Wichita plant and Meat Processing in Canada began in the 1970s.

In 1959, Safeway opened its first store in the new state of Alaska—the first major food retailer to enter that market. The company opened three stores in Anchorage and one in Fairbanks over the next several years. The store in downtown Fairbanks was built on the site of a red-light district, known as The Line, which operated for close to a half century. Most of these stores were in buildings constructed by Anchorage real estate developer Wally Hickel, who later became governor of Alaska and U.S. Secretary of the Interior.

Also in 1959, the firm also opened the first "marina-style" store on the Marina in San Francisco. Hundreds of stores in this barrel-vaulted-roof style opened during the next decade.

In 1961, the company sold its New York operations to Finast. In 1963, Safeway again opened stores in Hawaii, having exited this market in 1934. It leased one store in Culver City to animator/filmmaker Don Bluth, who used it as a theater until 1967.

In 1969, Safeway entered the Toronto market in Canada and the Houston market in Texas through opening new stores, rather than by acquisition. The firm ultimately failed against entrenched competition in both these markets.

In 1977, Safeway management instituted a program to fight counterfeit $100 bills by, among other things, telling employees that bills that lacked the words "In God We Trust" were counterfeit. Because Safeway had not sufficiently investigated the history of $100 bills, it was unaware that some bills still in circulation did not have the phrase. Eventually, an innocent shopper was incorrectly reported to Oakland, California, police for passing a "counterfeit" bill. He was arrested and strip-searched before Oakland police contacted the Treasury Department and realized the error. The 1981 jury verdict of joint and several liability for $45,000 against Safeway Stores and the City of Oakland was upheld in full by the Supreme Court of California on December 26, 1986.

In 1979, Peter Magowan, son of Robert Magowan and grandson of Charles Merrill, was appointed chairman and CEO of Safeway. Magowan managed Safeway for the next 13 years—presiding over the dramatic decline of the firm in terms of store numbers

1980s: Takeover and sell-offs
Following a hostile takeover bid from corporate raiders Herbert and Robert Haft, the chain was acquired by Kohlberg Kravis Roberts (KKR) acting as a white knight in 1986. With the assistance of KKR, the company was taken private and assumed tremendous debt. To pay off this debt, the company began selling off a large number of its operating divisions.

The divested domestic divisions of Safeway proved to be problematic for almost all those who acquired them. Essentially every purchasing entity hit financial troubles and either went bankrupt or was later acquired. (Hy-Vee and Fareway are the exceptions with the locations they acquired, having made them work.)

The international stores were more successful for their acquirers. Safeway plc, the operator of the UK stores, was sold to Argyll Foods, which itself was ultimately absorbed by Morrisons in 2004. Safeway Australia was sold to the Australian-based Woolworths Limited in 1985.

Safeway sold its stores in Southern California, including those in established markets like Los Angeles and San Diego, to The Vons Companies in 1988 in exchange for a 30 percent interest in the company. Safeway also scaled back its operations in Fresno, Modesto, Stockton, and Sacramento. Save Mart Supermarkets purchased the few remaining Fresno Safeway stores in 1996.

Many stores in the Eastern Division were also closed or sold in the 1987–1989 timeframe, including many recent additions in the DelMarVa Eastern Shore area.

Safeway's national presence was now reduced to several western states and Northern California, plus the Washington, D.C. area. Altogether, nearly half the 2,200 stores in the chain were sold.

Expansion in the 1990s

The company was taken public again in 1990, with the Jordan stores sold to the Masri family in 1991. In December 2003, the Masri family sold it to The Sultan Center of Kuwait. The late 1990s and early 2000s once again saw Safeway rapidly expand into new territories under a variety of regional names. In 1997, Safeway bought out the rest of The Vons Companies, giving it Southern California stores once more. In 1998, Chicago-based Dominick's Finer Foods was acquired from Yucaipa Companies. While Safeway had stores in Alaska, in 1999 they bought Carrs-Safeway, with the same year bringing the purchase of Houston-based Randall's Food Markets, which also had stores in Austin, Texas. Randalls also had stores in the Dallas-Fort Worth area through Randalls' other brand, Tom Thumb, along with gourmet grocery store Simon David. The purchase of Randalls also started the practice of Safeway-owned gas stations, as Randalls already had stations at their stores.

In 2000, Safeway started grocery delivery operations and in 2001 acquired the family-owned Genuardi's chain, with locations in Pennsylvania, New Jersey, and Delaware. While Safeway also created the subsidiary Blackhawk Network, a prepaid and payments network, a card-based financial solutions company, and a provider of third-party prepaid cards, around this time, Genuardi's would be the last grocery purchase Safeway would make.

Lifestyle stores

By the early 2000s, Safeway's expansion beyond the West Coast had been poorly received, citing Safeway's brands and West Coast-based buyers, with Dominick's on the sale block, and Randalls and Genuardi's losing market share.

To reinvigorate the flagging divisions, increase brand involvement, and to differentiate itself from its competitor, Safeway began a $100 million brand repositioning campaign labeled "Ingredients for life" in 2005.

The launch included a redesigned logo, a new slogan "Ingredients for life" alongside a four-panel life icon to be used throughout stores and advertising, and a web application called "FoodFlex" to improve consumer nutrition. Many locations are being converted to the "Lifestyle" format. The new look was designed by Michigan-based PPC Design. In addition to the "inviting decor with warm ambiance and subdued lighting", the move required heavy redesign of store layout, new employee uniforms, sushi and olive bars, and the addition of in-store Starbucks kiosks (with cupholders on grocery carts). The change also involved differentiating the company from competitors with promotions based on the company's extensive loyalty card database. This would be the design going forward for new and remodeled stores.

At the end of 2004, there were 142 "Lifestyle" format stores in the United States and Canada, with plans to open or remodel another 300 stores with this type of theme the following year. "Lifestyle" format stores have seen significantly higher average weekly sales than its other stores. By the end of 2006, shares were up, proving this rebranding campaign had a major impact on sale figures.

In July 2007, the company stock rose on speculation that Sears Holdings Corporation was seeking to purchase Safeway.

Decline and sale to Albertsons

In 2012, the company dissolved the Genuardi's chain in the Philadelphia metro through a combination of store selloffs and closures. Giant acquired 15 of the chain's stores and made an offer for a 16th which was instead sold to a local chain, McCaffrey's, as part of an antitrust settlement. Weis also bought three Genuardi's locations. A number of unprofitable Genuardi's units also had closed in 2010 and 2011 as their leases expired.

The Genuardi's stores in Wilmington, Delaware, were converted to the Safeway name in 2004 due to legal issues stemming from a union contract signed by the management of early Safeway stores in Delaware that closed in 1982. The current Safeway locations in Delaware are served by division offices in the Baltimore–Washington metropolitan area, where Safeway has long been a major grocer.

In 2011, Safeway signed an agreement with UNFI, for the distribution to all of Safeway's banners in the United States for non-proprietary natural, organic and specialty products effective October 2011.

In 2013, it was announced that Cerberus Capital Management were exploring a deal for all or part of Safeway. On June 12, 2013, Sobeys announced it would acquire Safeway's operations in Canada for CAD$5.8 billion, subject to regulatory approval. The move will bolster its presence in Western Canada, where Safeway was predominant. Sobeys completed the sale five months later while keeping the Safeway banner on its newly acquired stores while changing private labels to be more inline with those used by its new parent.

In October 2013, Safeway announced that it would close and sell its remaining Dominick's stores in the Chicago area by early 2014. The announcement spurred its competitors to seek employees and desirable store locations they could purchase. One location would remain open in Bannockburn, Illinois until January 25, 2014.

On February 19, 2014, Safeway began to explore selling itself. On March 6, 2014, longtime rival Albertsons, backed by Cerberus Capital Management announced it would purchase Safeway for $9.4 billion in a deal expected to close in the 4th quarter of the year. Many of Safeway's private brands and IT systems were integrated and replaced Albertsons legacy equipment. As part of the purchase, Blackhawk Network was spun off into an independent company. Blackhawk remained Safeway's sole gift card provider until 2021, when Albertsons switched to InComm for branded gift cards and network activation. Blackhawk continued to provide Safeway with store gift cards and store credit until January 5th 2023, at which point the remaining Blackhawk cards were taken offline (though cards activated prior to this point will not expire until 2037).

Safeway as a supermarket brand
On January 30, 2015, the merger between Safeway and Albertsons was finalized. As part of the merger, Bellingham, Washington-headquartered grocery chain Haggen announced it would buy 146 Vons, Albertsons, and Pavilions stores across Washington, Oregon, California, Nevada, and Arizona as part of anti-monopoly requirements following the merger. Some of the major metropolitan areas affected were Los Angeles, Portland, Phoenix, Tucson, San Diego, Bakersfield, Seattle, and Las Vegas. Other stores in the West Coast, along with the Dallas-Fort Worth Metroplex market, also saw divestments.

Following the purchase, Safeway and its remaining brands, Randalls, Tom Thumb, Vons, and Pavilions, along with their respective divisions, were integrated into the operations of Albertsons, and Safeway's proprietary food products were distributed in all of the Albertsons-Safeway banners, replacing Albertsons' SuperValu branded products. All former Albertsons banners had their telephones and NCR POS systems replaced with Safeway's Toshiba/IBM hardware. 

On January 11, 2016, it was announced that the three remaining Albertsons stores in Florida, located in Largo, Altamonte Springs and Oakland Park, would be re-bannered as Safeway; this marks the first time that the Safeway brand would exist on a supermarket operation in Florida. These stores were short lived, as Albertsons later abandoned their Florida operations and sold the stores to Publix in 2018.

Beginning in 2018, Safeway and Albertsons began remodeling stores with a new theme that moved away from the "Lifestyle" decor first introduced in the early 2000s. The new theme features brighter colors and tiled backsplashes on department signage. The company has also begun to replace most of its lighting setup in favor of LEDs. Most older stores used fluorescent tubes in the main aisles with halogen spotlights in the departments or to accent display cases for a relaxed ambiance. The new standard is LED retrofit tubes for the old fluorescent fixtures, and completely replacing the halogen spot lamps with LED strips or office-style ceiling fixtures that focus on overall illumination instead of targeted, accented lighting. They also replaced lighting in employee areas and offices throughout 2021.

In August 2021, Safeway launched FreshPass, a paid subscription service that allows for free unlimited delivery/pickup and gives members exclusive discounts and offers. The program was launched with a refreshed mobile app that supports scan-and-pay shopping in select markets. Safeway also activated QR payments and digital receipts with the updated mobile app. The "Just for U" rewards program (commonly branded J4U), first launched in 2012, was simplified to "for u" as part of the FreshPass launch.

Other Albertsons stores in various markets have rebannered as Safeway, including Denver and Seattle.

Private brands
"Signature Select" is the company's signature private label that offers an everyday range of products. "Signature Reserve" is the company's private label for more upscale products. The label "Primo Taglio" is used for upscale deli products and "Lucerne" is the main dairy line for the company. In 2006, Safeway introduced an organically grown and processed line of products named "O Organics". A number of prepared dishes and soups are available under "Signature Cafe". After its acquisition by Albertsons, the combined company adopted Safeway's private label brand program, previously named "Safeway Select".

Brand list 
Some of the brands in use are:

 Signature Select - Main line of grocery products
 Signature Reserve - Premium alternative to products in the Signature Select line
 Value Corner - Cheaper alternative to products in the Signature Select/Lucerne line
 O Organics - Organic products
 Open Nature - 100% natural products
 Lucerne Dairy Farms - Main dairy brand, used for ice cream, cheese, yogurt, and milk
 Signature Cafe - Brand used for food sold at the deli counter, soups, and refrigerated food made by the deli and sold in the Deli Department
 Signature Farms - Produce Department brand for fresh fruits and vegetables
 Signature Care - Home and wellness products
 Primo Taglio - Deli brand for meat and cheese
 Debi Lilly Design - Floral and home décor products
 waterfrontBISTRO - Frozen seafood products

Signature Select / Refreshe Brand Cola is produced by Cotts Beverages for Safeway; it is bottled in San Bernardino, California. Safeway Refreshe brand bottled water is bottled by Advanced H2O, LLC in Stockton, California. Safeway closed its water bottling plant in downtown Los Angeles in January 2012.

Safeway grocery delivery
Safeway has offered online grocery delivery service in select markets starting in the American Northwest region in 2000. The service grew to deliver in six states and the District of Columbia, mostly along the west and east coast. Fueled by rising demand from the COVID-19 pandemic, Safeway has been rapidly expanding the number of locations offering contactless curbside pickup (marketed as "DriveUp & Go"), and continues to offer traditional prescheduled delivery services along with on-demand deliveries filled via Instacart. In early 2020, Safeway began offering deli department items and prepared-to-order sandwiches on DoorDash, and eventually began offering grocery delivery as well once they introduced DoorDash Marketplace. Curbside pickup orders are processed by Store Employees with items off the shelf in a manner similar to Instacart.

In January 2021, Albertsons announced that it would be laying off union company-employed grocery delivery drivers at Safeway stores in the Northern California region, stating that they would be transferring those services to app-based delivery platforms, such as Instacart. This decision only affected employees working in the 'traditional' scheduled delivery department inside the stores, and all employees were offered other positions within the company. This announcement came several weeks after Proposition 22 was passed in California, which allowed app-based services to classify their employees as independent contractors instead of full-time employees. The company has appeared to scale back this approach however, as deliveries are still handled by employees at some larger, high-volume locations in the area. At most neighborhood locations, delivery is now handled exclusively by DoorDash and Instacart.

Past concepts
Safeway throughout the decades has ventured and experimented with different concepts and themes for its locations and stores.

In 1963, Safeway developed the Super S format—which combined a general merchandise and drug store and a new Safeway supermarket in the same building. The stores shared a common entrance, but operated as separate businesses with their own checkstands. The first outlet opened in Anchorage, Alaska. In 1965, 22 existing Super S stores were sold to Skaggs Drug Stores. Safeway sold the remaining stores in 1971. Some of these stores, such as #1526 outside the Valley Fair Mall in San Jose, were walled off and subdivided to allow chain drugstores to sign leases while the Safeway remained operating in its original configuration.

In 1964, Safeway opened a trial two-level International Store at 12th and F Street in Washington, D.C., with a conventional Safeway downstairs and a gourmet store on the upper floor. The Safeway International Store range included wild boar steaks, snow hare, suckling pig, and reindeer steaks.

The company also made a number of attempts to repurpose older, smaller store sites, opening Food Barn, a discount grocery outlet, and Liquor Barn, a discount liquor outlet, in the 1970s. Safeway also trialed Town House in Washington, D.C., small stores targeting apartment dwellers, and a gourmet store concept, Bon Appetit in San Francisco and Tiburon, California.

In 1969, Safeway formed a joint venture with Holly Farms Poultry Industries (now part of Tyson Foods) to open Holly Farms Fried Chicken in an effort to diversify into fast food restaurants and compete with KFC. The first store opened in Colonial Heights, Virginia in August 1969.

Safeway also acquired Pak 'n Save Foods, a box warehouse concept, as part of the 1983 purchase of Brentwood in Northern California. While these stores were initially distinct in price points and bulk sales, today they are functionally and operationally the same as regular Safeway supermarkets.

Logos
 The S Medallion (1946–1982): The red "S" part was slightly thinned in the late 1950s, and remained that way through 1982.
 The Ribbon Leaf (1982–2006): Safeway used this logo from 1982 to 2006. The red stylized "S" was still in the center.
 The Yin-Yang – Life logo (2006–present): The stylized "S" is still located in the center of a red "tube TV screen-style" shape, but is now white.

Slogans

 "An Admonition and an Invitation to Drive the Safeway, Buy the Safeway" (original)
 "People on the Go, Go Safeway" (pre-1969)
 "Since We're Neighbors, Let's Be Friends" (1969–1979) was probably the first Safeway advertising campaign to make use of a singalong jingle. This slogan was used by the U.S. stores until July 16, 1979, when the "Everything" slogan was adopted.
 "Everything You Want from a Store and a Little Bit More" (1979 – December 1981) was the campaign launched on July 16, 1979, and was adopted, perhaps, to reflect the image of Safeway stores as "one stop shopping centers". This campaign was used through December 1981, although it was in use in the UK into the 1990s.
 "Today's Safeway: Where You Get a Little Bit More" (January 1982 – 1983) was the first Safeway ad campaign to make use of the company's new "ribbon leaf" logo.
 "America's Favorite Food Store" (1983–1986)
 "I Work an Honest Day and I Want an Honest Deal" (1985–1987) and "America's favorite food store" tagline were used with this campaign through 1986, until the buyout and divestitures, which reduced the store count and made the "America's favorite" line inaccurate; it also featured a song.
 "Nobody Does It Better" (1992 – late 1990s): This campaign is unique for being adapted from a pop song. In this case, the song was a hit for Carly Simon in 1977. Simon sang it as the theme song to 1977's James Bond movie, The Spy Who Loved Me. The 1993 version used in the commercials was recorded by R&B Grammy Award–winning singer Patti LaBelle.
 "Giving Our Best" (2001–2005)
 "Vons Is Value" (mid-to-late 1990s) was used only for Vons stores in Southern California. This was the first Vons ad campaign since Safeway took over ownership of the chain.
 "Ours Is Bigger Than Yours" (mid-1990s), in reference to the expansion of produce departments in Northern California.
 "Delivering Our Best" (late 1990s – 2005) was used only for grocery delivery
 "Ingredients for life" (2005–2015): Was introduced during the relaunch, as part of its lifestyle "branding". 
 "fresh to your door" (2012–2019): used only for grocery delivery
 "It's Just Better" (2015–present): used by both Albertsons and Safeway as a combined company.
 "Fresh Foods, Local Flavors" (2019–present): used in Albertsons/Safeway Denver Division

Safeway corporate information

Safeway ATM Network
The Safeway ATM Network, run for Safeway by Cardtronics, operates in Colorado, Oregon, Wyoming and Washington. Usually, one machine is located near the front of each store that has an ATM. Cirrus, Plus, Star, and NYCE are on the network. The network started late 1998 in Denver and expanded into Wyoming, Washington, and Oregon.

Support offices
 California
Pleasanton, California (Headquarters), Corporate Call Center, IT Support Services, Retail Pricing
 Colorado
Denver, Colorado (Offices, Safeway Security, Trucking)
 Arizona
Phoenix, Arizona (Offices, Accounting Offices, IT)
 Maryland
Lanham, Maryland (Eastern US Headquarters)
Philippines
Manila, Philippines (IT Support Services)

Safeway Category Optimization Process
Safeway transitioned from regional control of its product assortments to national category management, known as the Safeway Category Optimization Process (SCOP). With all dry grocery corporate buying done from Safeway's Pleasanton offices, it is said it will increase representation of manufacturers by experienced sales professionals with extensive product and category knowledge. Corporate produce buying offices are located in Phoenix, Arizona. This will mean consistency across the Safeway chain, meaning one could go into a store in Winnipeg or San Francisco and find the same products at the same price, as all negotiation is now done at the corporate level.

Animal welfare concerns
In 2012, Mercy for Animals conducted an undercover investigation at Christensen Farms, a pork supplier to Safeway, Walmart, Costco, Kroger, and Kmart. Before the public release of Mercy for Animals' investigation at Christensen Farms, Safeway announced it would begin requiring pork suppliers to phase out gestation crates.

In 2008, Greenpeace started ranking America's major supermarket chains on their seafood sustainability practices because, according to Phil Radford, Greenpeace U.S. CEO, "three quarters of global fish stocks are suffering from overfishing, and 90% of top marine predators are already gone". Criteria included the number of threatened fish species supermarkets sold, their seafood purchasing policies, and ocean legislation policies it supported. Greenpeace annual Carting Away the Oceans (CATO) report ranks supermarkets on a scale of 1 to 10, with 1 being least sustainable with seafood policies and 10 being the most sustainable with seafood policies. Safeway ranked second best (7.1 out of 10) on the 2013 CATO Report by ensuring that its store brand of canned tuna was sustainably fished and by lobbying for science-based ocean conservation policies.

In 2016, Safeway parent company Albertsons joined a growing wave of companies moving toward "cage-free" egg production and announced a planned shift to cage-free eggs by 2025 following campaigns by The Humane League, Mercy for Animals, The Humane Society of the United States, and others.

Safeway music
Safeway music is provided by InStore Broadcasting Network. The satellite network also beams commercials and advertisements for Safeway products and brands that play intermittently with the music.

See also

 List of supermarket chains in the United States
 List of online grocers
 Safeway (Australia)—Sold to Woolworths Limited Australia in 1985. All locations renamed to Woolworths Supermarkets from 2008 to 2017.
 Safeway (Canada)—Sold to Sobeys in 2013. Continues to use the Safeway banner.
 Safeway (UK)—Sold to Argyll Foods in 1987. Continued to use the Safeway name until 2005, after they were acquired by Morrisons in 2004.

References

External links

 

 
Supermarkets of the United States
Superstores in the United States
Online grocers
Companies based in Pleasanton, California
American companies established in 1915
Retail companies established in 1915
1915 establishments in Idaho
Economy of the Western United States
Companies formerly listed on the New York Stock Exchange
1986 mergers and acquisitions
Skaggs family
Supermarkets based in California
2015 mergers and acquisitions